Jersey Portuguese F.C. is a football club based on the Channel Island of Jersey. They are affiliated to the Jersey Football Association and play in the Jersey Football Combination Championship. They stopped playing in 2014.

References

External links
Official website

Football clubs in Jersey